Gregorian Bivolaru also known as Magnus Aurolsson and nicknamed Grieg, Grig or, by the press, Guru (born 12 March 1952) is the founder of the Movement for Spiritual Integration into the Absolute (MISA).

In 2005, the Supreme Court of Sweden agreed to grant political refugee status to Bivolaru in response to his claims of persecution by Romanian authorities. On 14 June 2013, the High Court of Cassation and Justice of Romania definitively sentenced Gregorian Bivolaru to 6 years in prison, without suspension, for sexual acts with a minor. Furthermore, he was acquitted for all the other charges against him (e.g. minor trafficking). Gregorian Bivolaru is also on the 'wanted' list of Interpol, for criminal charges of aggravated trafficking in human beings and Sexual abuse of minors. In a European Court of Human Rights judgement in 2021, he was proclaimed to be criminal on-the-run for forcing his followers to turn over their life savings to him and have sex with each other, and him, at his command. Young female members said they were forced to work as strippers and appear in hardcore porn films. In 2013, he was convicted in absentia for having sex with a minor. France executed a European Arrest Warrant (EAW) for him.

Early life
Gregorian Bivolaru, born in Tărtășești, Ilfov County, (now in Dâmbovița County), Romania, completed high school in Bucharest, he joined a predecessor to the Bucharest Metro company as an unskilled labourer in 1971. He began practicing yoga at the age of 17.

During the communist regime Gregorian Bivolaru was kept under observation by the Department of State Security, because he was practicing and teaching yoga, yoga being outlawed in Romania at that time. He was jailed twice and forcefully hospitalized in a psychiatric ward once. In 2012 two courts acknowledged that Gregorian Bivolaru was sentenced and jailed for political reasons during the communist regime (pornography was also illegal during the communist regime) ("the political nature of the convictions decided against the claimant by penal sentence no. 68/1977, penal sentence no. 960/1984 and of the claimant's hospitalization ruled against him by penal sentence no. 616/1989").

In 1977, he was arrested on the charge of distributing pornographic materials and sentenced to one year in prison, but he did not complete it due to an amnesty granted for all minor convictions by the President of Romania Nicolae Ceauşescu on his birthday. On 17 April 1984 he was arrested again for the distribution of pornographic materials. He was locked up in a Securitate cell, from which he managed to escape. He was captured a few days afterwards, then tried only on the charges of escaping from prison and sentenced to 18 months in jail.

On 17 August 1989 he was arrested again, on the grounds that he was  mentally unhinged and a menace to the general public. Prosecutors requested he be hospitalized, which was granted two days later on 19 August 1989 by the sector 1 Tribunal of Bucharest based on a report submitted by National Institute for Legal Medicine IML. He was sentenced to hospitalization at The Poiana Mare Neuropsychiatry Hospital in Dolj county. In the IML report the diagnostic was schizoid personality disorder, paranoia with obsessive-phobic elements. Apparently confirming the diagnostic of schizoid personality disorder, a psychologist, a close friend of Bivolaru when asked by a young girl in 1983 about attending Bivolaru's courses, advised her to stay clear of him because he is a "psychopath".

MISA
In Romania, yoga was forbidden in 1982, in connection with the “Transcendental Meditation scandal”, whose victim Gregorian Bivolaru was also. Yoga was illegal in Romania until December 1989, the time of the Romanian Revolution. After it, Gregorian Bivolaru founded the Movement for Spiritual Integration into the Absolute (MISA). MISA has been founded as a non-profit association, by judicial decision on 23 January 1990 by the Court of Bucharest's First District. It has a socio-professional, philosophical and educative character, aiming to increase the spiritual level of people by spreading the yoga knowledge and practices. MISA included bogus lectures on related disciplines such as Kashmirian philosophy and Ayurveda (traditional Indian medicine). The yoga courses were first held in Bucharest but quickly spread all over the country.

Finnish broadcasting company Yle published a program under MOT series on MISA and Gregorian Bivolaru. In the program, ex-Natha members were interviewed. Natha is described as being rooted to Romanian MISA movement. The interviewees described controversial activities like vomiting as a way of purification. Also sexual tendencies like pornography and sexual relations with the teachers and pupils were reported. A representative of Finnish Natha commented that sex is always a matter between the two persons. Seppo Isotalo, a human rights activist who tried to help MISA in confrontation with Romanian authorities, described MISA as follows:

Gregorian Bivolaru was an honorary member of the European Yoga Council until April 2008, when he was expelled from it and from all affiliated branches.

Shri Yogacharya Ajita, as President of the European Yoga Council of European Yoga Alliance and Honorary Secretary of the European Federation of Yoga for the European Union, announced the following to the International Yoga Federation: "My official resolution as president of the European Yoga Council of the European Yoga Alliance is that Mihai Stoian, Grieg Bivolaru and all people linked to the MISA/NATHA organization are immediately expelled from our organization and that we stop their membership, because it has been proven that they are not busy with Yoga in whatever form, that they even use Yoga as a cover for illegal practices, that they do not respect the rules and standards of our organization, that they show an unheard lack of moral integrity, and cannot be convinced to change their attitude."

According to The Times of India, MISA currently operates under different names in different countries. It is Natha in Denmark and Portugal, Tara in the US and UK and Satya in India.

Legal problems
Police abuses were recorded in 1997 by 2 major human rights organizations:  and Amnesty International.

On 18 March 2004 the authorities - prosecutors, police, gendarmes, secret services - started an intimidation campaign documented by the APADOR-CH (the local branch for the International Helsinki Committee for Human Rights) and reported by the IHF 2004 report.

On 28 March 2004 Gregorian Bivolaru was detained for “attempt of fraudulent crossing of the border” at Nadlac Customs, he was taken to Bucharest. The Bucharest Court, had issued an arrest warrant for 29 days on the name of Gregorian Bivolaru, but under another accusation: an alleged sexual relations with a minor.

After two days of investigations, the Appeal Court from Bucharest disposed setting Gregorian Bivolaru free. Although the decision had been taken at 17.00, he was set free only at 23.00 same day, in the meantime he was moved by the gendarmes, wearing hand-cuffs, from The Appeal Court to the Court of Law of district no 5 to Penal Investigations Department, then back to Court of Law of district no. 5, all of these confusing the journalists, the public and his lawyers.

Another warrant of arrest was issued on 31 May 2004 against Bivolaru, who fled the country hidden in a lorry.

In 2005, he was charged with eight counts, including sex with a minor, tax evasion, and illegally crossing the border to escape prosecution. In March 2005, Bivolaru asked for asylum in Sweden, claiming that he feared persecution in Romania. On 4 April 2005 the Swedish police of Malmö detained Bivolaru.

On 15 April the Romanian Police issued a second warrant in his name, in which he was accused of "human trafficking and other charges related to organized crime" (related to an allegedly sequestration of some persons in some ashrams and forcing them to work without being paid).

On 21 October 2005 the Supreme Court of Sweden rejected the extradition request and set Bivolaru free. The Supreme Court judges concluded that Bivolaru would not receive a fair trial in Romania. Anette Swedow, the chief prosecutor in the Gregorian Bivolaru case declared: "The final decision is that should Bivolaru be extradited in Romania, he runs the risk of being deported, persecuted and harassed, because of his religious businesses he applies within the yoga movement."

This decision was relayed to the Romanian Ministry of Justice on 16 December 2005. In response, the Romanian Justice Minister, Monica Macovei, sent the general prosecutor a request to verify the manner in which the investigations in this case took place. The same request has been sent to the president of the Superior Council of Magistracy (SCM), Dan Lupașcu.

The decision of the Swedish Immigration Authority that Gregorian Bivolaru should be granted political asylum was made public on the last day of 2005.

The lawyers of Gregorian Bivolaru filed two applications to the European Court for Human Rights. The applications cover the violations that occurred while issuing the two arrest warrants.

On 18 January 2011 Bivolaru's trial was, for the tenth time, postponed again until 23 March 2011, marking his case as one of the oldest in the Cluj court. This trial for human trafficking is still pending, but the unconstitutionality exceptions invoked by the suspects were already rejected.

The solution in another trial, held at the Sibiu court, was that the charges were dropped, partly due to lack of evidence for some charges (the prosecutors refused to show authorization for performing the taps, considering it a state secret, so evidence was dropped) and partly due to exceeding the statute of limitations corresponding to the charges.

Bivolaru has requested damages from the Romanian state for being sentenced to mandatory psychiatric treatment during the Communist regime.

On 14 June 2013 the High Court of Cassation and Justice of Romania definitively sentenced Gregorian Bivolaru to 6 years in prison, without suspension, for sexual acts with a minor (a 17-year-old girl), D.M., who says she never had sexual relations with Bivolaru, but she was forced to declare so after 10 hours of police investigation in absence of her parents or a lawyer. Furthermore, he was acquitted of all the other charges against him (e.g. trafficking of minors). Also, on the same day, Court Judge Ionuț Matei received a letter threatening him and his family. To announce this he organized a press conference before the final court session .

On 27 February 2016 Bivolaru was arrested in France. After extradition from France, he was imprisoned in Romania. He has requested a retrial.

He had to do one year and three months less than six years, since he had already spent this time in detention.

Alba Iulia Court of Appeals had rejected Bivolaru's demand for a retrial.

On 13 September 2017 he was conditionally released from prison. After being conditionally released, Bivolaru fled the country shortly after. At present (2023) he is wanted by Interpol for aggravated trafficking in human beings and sexual assault at the request of Finland. His present whereabouts are unknown.

Controversies

An article in Huffington Post referred to MISA as a

A Vice article claims that

Arabella Agnes Marquez (born Mureșan) claimed in court she was sexually exploited by Gregorian Bivolaru and lost her virginity to him while she was only 15.

In one his books, Bivolaru claims Freemasonry is a satanic conspiracy trying to achieve world domination via the establishment of a world masonic government, a world kingdom, as well as a unique world religion.

Gregorian Bivolaru claims to have contact with extraterrestrials who have healing powers.

See also
List of fugitives from justice who disappeared

Notes

   16 April 2005, "Guru Bivolaru are mandat pentru crima organizata" (Evenimentul Zilei)  - see also: "Court admits political persecution"
   5 April 2005, "Gregorian Bivolaru a fost arestat in Suedia" (Ştiri România On-Line)
   6 April 2005, "Cum a trecut Guru granita?" (Evenimentul Zilei)
   21 April 2005, "Guru Bivolaru a iesit ilegal din Romania" (Evenimentul Zilei)
   27 March 2004, "A evadat in '84 din arestul Securitatii" (Jurnalul Naţional)
   "DECIZIA Nr.211 din 1 noiembrie 2000" (Legile Romaniei)
   1 April 2005, "Gabriel Bivolaru si Gregorian Bivolaru sunt frati" (stiri.kappa.ro)
   21 October 2005, "Guru mediteaza in libertate" (Evenimentul Zilei)
  23 October 2005, "Gregorian Bivolaru became a free man as per the ruling issued by the Swedish Supreme Court of Justice" (Evenimentul Zilei)
   17 December 2005, "Macovei cere verificarea cazului Gregorian Bivolaru" (Evenimentul Zilei)
   3 January 2006, "Suedia îi  acordă azil politic lui Gregorian Bivolaru" (BBC Romanian)
   8 February 2006, "Doua condamnari pentru orgii sexuale" (România Liberă)

References

1952 births
Fugitives
Fugitives wanted by Romania
Living people
People from Dâmbovița County
Prisoners and detainees of Romania
Prisoners and detainees of Sweden
Romanian expatriates in Sweden
Romanian people convicted of child sexual abuse
Romanian people imprisoned abroad
Romanian prisoners and detainees
Romanian refugees
People with schizoid personality disorder
Cult leaders
Violence against women in Romania